Gürçayır is a quarter of the town Ardahan, Ardahan District, Ardahan Province, Turkey. Its population is 215 (2021).

References

Ardahan District